The Netherlands Authority for the Financial Markets is the financial services regulatory authority for the Netherlands. Its role is comparable to the role of the SEC in the United States.

History
The Netherlands Authority for the Financial Markets was set up on 1 March 2002 as the successor to the Securities Board of the Netherlands.  As part of the legislation that created the AFM, its responsibilities were greatly expanded to cover all financial products, including savings, investments, loans, insurance and accounting.

The AFM falls under the political responsibility of the Minister of Finance but is an autonomous administrative authority, which means that the AFM operates autonomously based on the powers given by the Minister of Finance.

Responsibilities and operations

The Netherlands Authority for the Financial Markets is the body responsible for regulating behaviour on the financial markets in the Netherlands. This includes regulating the behaviour of all parties involved with the savings, loans, investment and insurance markets.  It includes regulating all organisations that provide financial products and those that issue products, including stock exchanges.

The AFM has the following three aims:

making the financial markets more accessible
promoting the smooth operation of the financial markets
promoting confidence in the financial markets.

The public, the business sector and the government all depend on the financial products offered on the various markets for many of their activities. Confidence in the orderly and honest operation of these markets is therefore crucial.

The AFM works in conjunction with the De Nederlandsche Bank which is responsible for prudential regulation in the Netherlands.

Administration

The executive board of the AFM consists of:
Hanzo van Beusekom (since September 2019, interim chairman)
Gerben Everts (since November 2012)
Jos Heuvelman (since September 2018)
Ellen van Schoten is COO since  1 October 2017.

International
With the advent of Euronext stock exchange which is not only located in Amsterdam, but also in Paris, Brussels, London and Lisbon, the AFM works closely with the regulators in those other countries to regulate this cross border stock exchange.

The AFM is a member of the European Securities and Markets Authority (ESMA). ESMA is an independent EU Authority that contributes to safeguarding the stability of the European Union's financial system by enhancing the protection of investors and promoting stable and orderly financial markets. The AFM also participates in the International Organization of Securities Commissions (IOSCO), which brings together more than 80 securities regulators from all around the world.
In its role as an audit supervisor, AFM is also a member of the International Forum of Independent Audit Regulators (IFIAR).

See also
Securities Commission
Economy of the Netherlands

References

External links
Official site

Government agencies of the Netherlands
Financial regulatory authorities of the Netherlands